Luis Fernando Escobar (born 19 March 1984) is a football striker who most recently played for Liga Panameña de Fútbol team Sporting San Miguelito.

Club career
Escobar participated in the CONCACAF Champions League 2008-09 with FC Tauro and scored 1 goal in 8 games.

References

1984 births
Living people
Colombian footballers
Academia F.C. players
Once Caldas footballers
Atlético La Sabana footballers
Cortuluá footballers
Tauro F.C. players
Atlético Chiriquí players
Sporting San Miguelito players
Colombian expatriate footballers
Expatriate footballers in Panama
Colombian expatriate sportspeople in Panama
Association football forwards
Footballers from Barranquilla